Day of the Death is the second album by American hardcore punk band Death by Stereo, released in 2001.

The band became more widely known after this release due to their switch from the Indecision Records label to the larger Epitaph Records label. This is the group's first album on Epitaph Records.

Track listing

"Death for Life" is actually only 3:00 long, but includes five minutes of silence (3:00–8:00) and a hidden track begins: there is a section right near the end which is the sound of a gong and a manic scream.

Band line-up
 Efrem Schulz - vocals
 Jim Miner - rhythm guitar, backing vocals
 Dan Palmer - lead guitar, backing vocals
 Paul Miner - bass, backing vocals
 Tim Bender - drums, backing vocals

Adtional credits
 Recorded at For the Record and Death Tracks
 Engineered by Paul Miner
 Assistant engineered by Sergio Chavez
 Mastered by Eddy Schreyer at Oasis Mastering

References

Death by Stereo albums
2001 albums
Epitaph Records albums